The Congress of Përmet, was a meeting of the Albanian communist leaders on May 24, 1944, in Përmet, Albania, which elected a Provisional Government. The congress was modeled after the Anti-Fascist Council for the National Liberation of Yugoslavia. 188 delegates attended the Congress. The majority of the delegates came from Southern and Central Albania: 25 from Korça, 48 from Vlora-Gjirokastra, 15 from Berat, 8 from Elbasan, 10 from Tirana, 3 from Peza, 2 from Durrës. Additionally, the congress was attended by delegates of the National Liberation Movement and the Brigades.

Politico-military conditions for calling the Congress of Përmet

The National Liberation Movement (LANÇ) and the Albanian National Liberation Army (UNÇSH), or partisan forces, successfully resisted the occupying German army's and local collaborators' concerted onslaught against them in the winter of 1943–44. The German army's propaganda, as well as that of Tirana's quisling administration, stated at the time that the anti-fascist resistance and the partisan fight had been wiped out. Despite the casualties incurred as a result of this operation, was able to survive and establish its position as a significant combat force. It began swiftly expanding in the early spring of 1944, and before the end of the year, it had swept throughout Albanian territory. Other partisan brigades, as well as various local battalions and squadrons, were recruited to the UNSH from January through May of that year. The military impetus in Albania transferred to the Albanian National Liberation Army by the end of the spring of 1944; the Germans and collaborationist troops were restricted mostly to city garrisons, particularly in southern Albania. Internationally, the anti-fascist coalition led by the three Great Powers of the Soviet Union, Britain, and the United States was optimistic.

Consistent with this optimistic situation; to balance the achievements of the LANÇ and to determine the objectives and platform for the further continuation of the liberation war and the governance of the country, the Presidency of the General National Liberation Council decided, on April 15, 1944, to convene the Antifascist Congress of Përmet.

The democratic procedure of the selection of the delegates

It's worth noting that, despite the fact that LANÇ was at war, the concepts and decisions for conducting elections were progressive and democratic. The General National Liberation Council's presidency issued a resolution for the election of delegates, which stated:

"The congress should include free zones, enemy-occupied territories, partisan and volunteer brigades and battalions, the Anti-Fascist Youth Union with 10 delegates, and the Women's Union with 5 delegates."

Delegates would be democratically chosen by open vote in liberated territories and army formations, while they would be appointed by county or city governments in non-liberated areas.

The decisions of the Përmet Congress

Given the diversity of its participants and their geographic representation, the Përmet anti-fascist Congress was a national or constitutional assembly whose aim was to elect the legislative and executive authorities that would administer the country until the conclusion of the war, and subsequently in freed Albania. The congress initially elected the General National Liberation Council (KPNÇ) as the highest governmental body; the principal legislative forum, and the only sovereign representation of the Albanian people, according to historical sources.

The KPNÇ elected the Presidency of the General Council consisting of 25 members; its president was elected Omer Nishani. Third, Congress elected the Anti-Fascist National Liberation Committee, which had the characteristics of a transitional administration. This committee, or provisional government, consisted of 11 members. The General Secretary of the KPNÇ, Enver Hoxha, was appointed head of the provisional government, while the well-known nationalist Myslim Peza was appointed deputy chairman of the provisional government. The KPNÇ, as a legislative body, since its formation during the days of the Congress, issued the first important acts or decisions, which were of great importance for the further development of the liberation war and the independence of Albania in later years.

The decisions of the Përmet Congress showed that LANÇ and the UNÇSH, as its main driving force, had created the belief that they would be the winners of the war and would govern the country after the victory. Although some foreign observers considered the optimism of the LANÇ leaders at the time to be overconfident, subsequent events proved that the analysis of the situation made by the UNÇSH and that LANÇ was rational and realistic.

The Congress of Përmet, declaring the former King Zog a person "non grata", legally put the stamp of the traitor on him, because he turned Albania into a vassal state of Italy and abandoned the people of the country (along with the rulers of his rulers) in difficult days of fascist occupation. The actions of this Congress also sent a clear message to Ballisto-Zogist quislings and collaborators: there would be no influence at the table for those who collaborated with the enemy, nor for those who waited for the invader to depart before "fighting."

References

Albanian Resistance
Albania in World War II
Communism in Albania
World War II conferences
Albanian nationalism
1944 conferences
 1944